Strength in Democracy (French: Forces et Démocratie) was a Canadian federal political party founded in 2014 by two Quebec Members of Parliament (MPs). From October 2014 to October 2015, the party was represented in the House of Commons of Canada by its two founding members, Jean-François Fortin and Jean-François Larose. The party was led from its inception by Fortin.

The party failed to win a seat in the 2015 federal election, and both its sitting MPs were defeated.  Fortin announced his resignation as leader on January 3, 2016. The party was deregistered by Elections Canada on September 9, 2016.

History

The Strength in Democracy party was formed on October 21, 2014, by Jean-François Fortin, a member of the Bloc Québécois, and Repentigny MP Jean-François Larose, a member of the New Democratic Party. The two MPs stated that the four major federal parties in Quebec (the Conservatives, New Democratic Party (NDP), Liberals, and Bloc Québécois) were focused on power and politics over representing their constituents.

Fortin, who had run for the leadership of the Bloc Québécois (BQ) in 2011, had left the BQ in August 2014 to sit as an independent MP citing disapproval of new BQ leader Mario Beaulieu.

The party announced that it would run candidates outside of Quebec in the 2015 federal election under the name "Strength in Democracy", and its first candidate, Toban Leckie, was announced in Peterborough—Kawartha. Jennifer McCreath, who ran for the party in Avalon, was the first transgender candidate in a federal election.

Independent MP Manon Perreault, who had been expelled from the New Democratic Party after being convicted for mischief, was announced on August 12, 2015, as the Strength in Democracy candidate in Montcalm where she sought re-election.

References

External links
Official English site
Official French site
Strength in Democracy – Canadian Political Parties and Political Interest Groups – Web Archive created by the University of Toronto Libraries

2014 establishments in Quebec
2016 disestablishments in Quebec
Political parties established in 2014
Political parties disestablished in 2016
Federal political parties in Canada
Social democratic parties in Canada
Organizations based in Quebec
Matane